The Shusha or Shushi massacre, also known as the Shusha pogrom, was the mass killing of the Armenian population of Shusha from 22–26 March 1920 and the destruction and process of "cultural de-Armenianization" of Nagorno-Karabakh. The number of deaths vary across sources, with the most conservative estimate being 500, and the highest estimates reaching 20,000.

Background

At the end of the First World War, the ownership of the territory of Nagorno-Karabakh was disputed between the newly established republics of the Armenia and Azerbaijan. Shusha—the territory's largest settlement, its centre for social and cultural life, and with a mixed population consisting mostly of ethnic Armenians and Azerbaijanis—found itself at the heart of the dispute. The government of Azerbaijan proclaimed in Baku the annexation of the disputed territory and, on January 15, 1919, appointed Khosrov bek Sultanov, as governor-general of Karabakh. The United Kingdom had a small detachment of troops stationed in Shusha and acceded to Sultanov's appointment as provisional governor, but insisted that a final decision on the territory's ownership could only be decided at a future peace conference.

In response to Sultanov's appointment, the General Assembly of the Armenians of Karabakh (Armenian National Council of Karabakh), meeting in Shusha from February 10-21, issued a message stating that it "denies Azerbaijani authority in any form whatsoever." On April 23, 1919, the Karabakh Council convened in Shusha and again rejected Azerbaijan's claim of sovereignty, insisting on their right of self-determination. After this, a local Azerbaijani detachment encircled the Armenian quarters of Shusha and demanded that the inhabitants to surrender the fortress. Shots were fired, but by virtue of British mediation, the Armenians agreed to surrender to them instead. According to Colonel J.C. Rhea, acting Allied high commissioner, Sultanov "countenanced a polity of extermination of Armenians".

On the 4 and 5 June 1919, armed clashes occurred in Shusha between the two communities and Sultanov began a blockade of the town's Armenian quarters. American nurses working in Shusha for Near East Relief wrote of a massacre "by Tartars of 700 of the Christian inhabitants of the town." A cease-fire was quickly organised after the Armenian side agreed to Sultanov's condition that members of the Armenian National Council leave the town. However, a new wave of violence then swept through neighbouring Armenian-populated villages: in mid-June Azerbaijani mounted "irregulars", about 2,000 strong, attacked, looted and burnt a large Armenian village, Khaibalikend, just outside Shusha, and approximately 600 Armenians lay dead.

The Seventh Congress of the Armenians of Karabakh was convened in Shusha on 13 August 1919. It concluded with the agreement of 22 August, according to which Nagorno-Karabakh would consider itself to be provisionally within the borders of the Republic of Azerbaijan until its final status was decided at the Peace Conference in Paris. Armenians remained divided on their response and a stock of arms was built up on both sides and the Armenians decided to deter a Tatar attack by staging an abortive uprising.

Uprising

Matters came to a head on the evening of 22 March, when "the Varanda militia entered Shusha...supposedly to receive its pay and to felicitate Governor-General Sultanov on the occasion of Novruz Bairam," writes historian Richard G. Hovannisian. "That same night, about 100 armed men led by Nerses Azbekian slipped into the city to disarm the Azerbaijani garrison in the Armenian quarter. But everything went wrong. The Varanda militiamen spent most of the night eating and drinking and were late in taking up their assigned positions, whereas Azbekian's detachment, failing to link up with the militia, began firing on the Azerbaijani fort from afar, awakening the troops and sending them scurrying to arms." This jolted the Varanda militiamen from their initial dormancy, as they "began seizing Azerbaijani officers quartered in Armenian homes. The confusion on both sides continued until dawn, when the Azerbaijanis learned that their garrison at Khankend had held and, heartened, began to spread out into the Armenian quarter. The fighting took the Armenians of Shusha by surprise."

Massacre
Immediately after the quelling of the uprising, Azerbaijani troops, along with city's Azerbaijani inhabitants, turned their wrath on Shusha' Armenian population. The city's churches were put to the flame, as were cultural institutions, schools, libraries, the business section, and the homes of wealthy Armenians. Bishop Vahan (Ter-Grigorian), who had sought a policy of accommodation with the Azerbaijani authorities, was murdered and beheaded, his "head paraded through the streets on a spike." Chief of police Avetis Ter-Ghukasian was "turned into a human torch," while hundreds of others were similarly murdered with impunity.

Aftermath
Five to six thousand Armenians managed to escape by way of Karintak to Varanda and Dizak. By 11 April 1920, some thirty villages in Nagorno-Karabakh had been "devastated" by Azerbaijani forces as a result of the uprising, leaving 25,000 homeless (including nearly 6,000 refugees from Shusha).

Death toll 

According to the 1917 edition of Kavkazskiy kalendar, there were 43,869 residents in Shusha on —the city was composed of 23,396 Armenians who formed 53.3 percent of the population and 19,091 Shia Muslims (mainly Azerbaijanis) who formed 43.5 percent of the population.

The total death toll of the Shusha massacre remains a matter of dispute, with figures being offered from as low as several hundred being offered, to as high as 20,000. 

Citing a contemporary Armenian government report, Hovannisian places the death toll of the massacre at 500 Armenians and the destruction of many buildings in Shusha. German historian Jörg Baberowski states that the Armenian quarter of Shusha was "wiped off the face of the earth", indicated by 25 of 1,700 homes surviving the pogrom; also adding that 8,000 Armenians were massacred during the pogrom. Soviet historian Marietta Shaginyan wrote that 3–4 thousand or more than 12 thousand Armenians were killed and 7,000 homes were destroyed in three-days. The Great Soviet Encyclopedia entry for Shusha writes that "up to 20 percent of the population [of Shusha] died" when the city was burned.

Retribution 
Former minister of internal affairs of Azerbaijan Behbud Khan Javanshir was assassinated during Operation Nemesis by members of the Armenian Revolutionary Federation, who suspected him of involvement in the massacre.

Memory
The prominent Russian poet Osip Mandelstam, who visited Shusha in 1930, wrote the poem "The Phaeton Driver" (1931) in memory of the massacre and burning:

So in Nagorno-Karabakh
These were my fears
Forty thousand dead windows
Are visible there from all directions,
The cocoon of soulless work
Buried in the mountains.Osip Mandelstam. Sochineniia. 2 vols. (Moscow, 1990) 1: pp. 517–519.

Visiting Shusha with Osip, Nadezhda Mandelstam wrote, "in this town, which formerly, of course, was healthy and endowed with every amenity, the picture of catastrophe and massacres was terribly vivid ... They say after the massacres all the wells were full of corpses.... We didn't see anyone in the streets or on the mountain. Only in the centre of town, in the market-square, there were a lot of people, but there wasn't any Armenian among them, they were all Muslims." Numerous other communist officials recalled the destruction of the town, including, Sergo Ordzhonikidze, Olga Shatunovskaya, and Anastas Mikoyan and Marietta Shaginyan, Russian-Georgian writer Anaida Bestavashvili drew a comparison between the burning of Shusha to the destruction of Pompeii in her The People and the Monuments.

On March 20, 2000, a memorial stone was laid in Shusha on the site of the planned monument to the victims of the pogrom. The Nagorno-Karabakh Republic government introduced a proposal to the National Assembly to establish March 23 as a day of memorial for the victims of the pogrom.

See also
List of massacres in Azerbaijan

Notes

References

Bibliography 

 

 

 

 

 

 

 

 

1920 in Armenia
1920 in Azerbaijan
Massacres in Armenia
History of the Republic of Artsakh
Persecution of Oriental Orthodox Christians
Persecution of Christians by Muslims
Massacres in Azerbaijan
Conflicts in 1920
March 1920 events
Mass murder in 1920
Massacres in 1920
Azerbaijani war crimes
War crimes in Azerbaijan
Military history of Shusha
Massacres of Armenians